The AHL Hall of Fame is an online ice hockey museum dedicated to honoring members of the American Hockey League. Each year, a new class of inductees is enshrined during the AHL's All-Star Classic.

On January 5, 2006, the league announced that Johnny Bower, Jack Butterfield, Jody Gage, Fred Glover, Willie Marshall, Frank Mathers and Eddie Shore had been selected as the inaugural class of inductees. They were formally inducted in a ceremony in Winnipeg, Manitoba, on February 1, 2006.

Inductees
 2006: Johnny Bower, Jack Butterfield, Jody Gage, Fred Glover, Willie Marshall, Frank Mathers, Eddie Shore
 2007: Bun Cook, Dick Gamble, Gil Mayer, Mike Nykoluk
 2008: Steve Kraftcheck, Noel Price, Tim Tookey
 2009: Jim Anderson, Bruce Boudreau, Les Cunningham, Louis Pieri
 2010: Macgregor Kilpatrick, John Paddock, Marcel Paille, Bill Sweeney
 2011: Maurice Podoloff, Larry Wilson, Harry Pidhirny, Mitch Lamoureux
 2012: Joe Crozier, Jack Gordon, John Stevens, Zellio Toppazzini
 2013: Harvey Bennett, Ken Gernander, Jim Morrison, Peter White.
 2014: Bill Dineen, Al MacNeil, Bob Perreault, John Slaney.
 2015: Frederic Cassivi, James C. Hendy, Bronco Horvath, Art Stratton.
 2016: Bruce Cline, Ralph Keller, Jean-Francois Labbe, Bruce Landon.
 2017: Billy Dea, Bryan Helmer, Rob Murray, Doug Yingst.
 2018:  Jim Bartlett, Don Biggs, Brian Kilrea, Glenn Merkosky.
 2019: John Anderson, Don Cherry, Murray Eaves, Brad Smyth.
 2020: Robbie Ftorek, Denis Hamel, Darren Haydar, Fred Thurier.
2021: David Andrews.

See also 
Hockey Hall of Fame
ECHL Hall of Fame

References

External links
Official site of the AHL Hall of Fame

American Hockey League
Ice hockey museums and halls of fame
Awards established in 2006
American ice hockey trophies and awards
Halls of fame in Massachusetts